Biddle Air National Guard Base (formerly Horsham Air Guard Station, 2011–2021) is owned by the Pennsylvania Air National Guard and located in Horsham Township, Montgomery County, Pennsylvania, United States. The Air National Guard plays host to many different Army National Guard Units as well as other government agencies. The site was formerly the Naval Air Station Joint Reserve Base Willow Grove. It was renamed in honor of Charles Biddle, the founder of the Pennsylvania Air National Guard's 103rd Observation Squadron (now, the 103rd Attack Squadron).

Units

Horsham Air Guard Station is home to the following:

 111th Attack Wing
 Detachment 1, 201st RED HORSE Squadron
 270th Engineering Installation Squadron
 56th Stryker Brigade Combat Team
 316th Sustainment Command (Expeditionary)
 412th Engineer Command
 3rd Medical Command
 11th Aviation Command

References

External links
 Naval Air Station Joint Reserve Base Willow Grove
 Joint Interagency Installation Implementation Plan for Willow Grove/Horsham
 Horsham Township Land Reuse Authority
 

1928 establishments in Pennsylvania
2011 disestablishments in Pennsylvania
Buildings and structures in Montgomery County, Pennsylvania
Installations of the United States Air National Guard
Installations of the United States Air Force in Pennsylvania
Military Superfund sites
Superfund sites in Pennsylvania

ru:Уиллоу-Гров (станция авиации ВМС США)